Wujiaochang (Shanghainese: Ng-koh-zan) is an roundabout-centered area in Yangpu District, Shanghai, China hence its name. (Wujiaochang means "five-cornered Square"; as it is centered on a roundabout of five roads.) It is divided in half by the Middle Ring Road, which cuts straight above the roundabout. It is one of the ten designated business hubs in Shanghai.

History 

Wujiaochang was first created in the 1930s as the heart of the 'Great Shanghai' plan drawn up by the newly formed Republic of China. However, the Japanese Invasion of China in 1937 forced the construction to stop. When the war was over, the Chinese government was too poor to continue the project, so it was left to stand until the 21st century, when infrastructure and buildings were added and made the area a major business hub.

Roads interchanging at Wujiaochang 
As its name suggests, there are five roads interchanging at Wujiaochang. Those are (clockwise from north): Songhu Road (淞沪路) in the North, Xiangyin Road (翔殷路) in the east, Huangxing Road (黄兴路) in the southeast , Siping Road (四平路)in the southwest , and Handan Road (邯郸路) in the west. There are several universities located near Wujiaochang, including Fudan University, Tongji University and Shanghai University of Finance and Economics.

Businesses 
There are many businesses in Wujiaochang, such as the Wanda Plaza, Bailian Youyicheng Shopping Mall, Suning Electrical Appliances Market, Hopson One and Paris Spring, which makes Wujiaochang a fantastic shopping destination. There are also some hotels nearby.

See also 
Xujiahui, a shopping area similar to Wujiaochang.

Wujiaochang Station, a station on Shanghai Metro line 10 serving the area.

References 

Yangpu District